A close system call is a system call used to close a file descriptor by the kernel.  For most file systems, a program terminates access to a file in a filesystem using the close system call.  This flushes file buffers, updates file metadata, which may include and end-of-file indicator in the data; de-allocates resources associated with the file (including the file descriptor) and updates the system wide table of files in use.  Some programming languages maintain a data structure of files opened by their runtime library and may close when the program terminates.  This practice is known as resource acquisition is initialization (RAII).  Some operating systems will invoke the close on files held by a program if it terminates.  Some operating systems will invoke the close syscall as part of an operating system recovery as a result of a system failure.

C library POSIX definition

The  close call is standardized by the POSIX specification
int close  (int filedes);
int fclose (FILE *stream);

The function returns zero to indicate the file was closed successfully.  If any error occurs, a value of -1 is returned and errno is appropriately set.

The errors that can occur include:
 
 The argument supplied was not a valid file descriptor
 
 The function call was interrupted by a signal
 
 An I/O error occurred

References
 POSIX close

External links
 

C POSIX library
System calls